John or Johnny Hansen may refer to:

Sports
 John Hansen (footballer, born 1924) (1924–1990), Danish Olympic footballer
 John Hansen (footballer, born 1950), Scottish footballer
 John Hansen (footballer, born 1973), Danish footballer
 John Hansen (footballer, born 1974), Faroese international footballer
 John Hansen (rower) (born 1938), Danish Olympic rower
 Johnny Hansen (footballer, born 1943), Danish international footballer
 Johnny Hansen (footballer, born 1964), Danish international footballer 
 Johnny Hansen (footballer, born 1966), Danish international footballer
 Jonny Hanssen (footballer) (born 1972), Norwegian international footballer
 Jonny Hansen (footballer) (born 1981), Norwegian footballer

Other
 John Hansen (judge) (born 1945), New Zealand High Court Judge
 Johnny Hansen (musician) (born 1965), guitarist of Danish band Kandis
 Johnny Hansen (trade unionist) (born 1962), Norwegian trade unionist.
 John Hansen (voice actor), American voice actor
 John Hansen (Wisconsin politician) (1917–2015), Wisconsin politician
 John R. Hansen (1901–1974), U.S. Representative from Iowa
 John H.L. Hansen (born 1959), American speech technologist
 John P. Hansen (born 1943), Michigan politician

See also
 John Hanson (disambiguation)